New Balarampur Hal is a railway station of the Sealdah-Lalgola line in the Eastern Railway zone of Indian Railways. The station is situated beside National Highway 12 at Balarampur village in Murshidabad district in the Indian state of West Bengal. It serves Balarampur and surroundings village areas. Total six trains including Lalgola Passengers and few EMU trains stop there.

Electrification
The Krishnanagar– section, including New Balarampur Halt railway station was electrified in 2004. In 2010 the line became double tracked.

References

Railway stations in Murshidabad district
Sealdah railway division
Kolkata Suburban Railway stations